An interest in securities is the asset of a client for whom an intermediary holds securities on an unallocated basis, commingled with the interests in securities of other clients. The distinction between securities and interests in securities is often overlooked in practice.

Interests in securities are always intangible. The only evidence of them comprises electronic records. Interests in securities confer property rights in relation to the underlying securities, and in some cases these underlying securities comprise tangible bearer instruments. However, this does not mean that interests in securities are themselves tangible. They are unallocated, and therefore do not attach to any tangible asset.

Legal consequences of being intangible 

An important legal consequence of the intangible nature of interests in securities is that they, as choses in action, are incapable of possession at common law.

Interests in securities cannot be the subject of bailment, since the essence of bailment is the delivery of possession without the delivery of title. The rise of interests in securities therefore requires the traditional custodial relationship to be reappraised.

A pledge cannot take effect in relation to interests in securities. A purported pledge may be recharacterised as a floating charge in some circumstances, which in turn may be void for want of registration.

Intangible assets such as interests in securities also cannot be negotiable instrument, and there is an issue of whether this reduces security of transfer in securities markets. he "holder in due course" of a traditional negotiable instrument (very broadly, the good faith purchaser) takes the instrument free from prior claims, and can get good title from a thief.

Securities (finance)